Angus William MacLise (March 14, 1938 – June 21, 1979) was an American percussionist, composer, poet, occultist and calligrapher, known as the first drummer for the Velvet Underground who abruptly quit due to disagreements with the band playing their first paid show.

Biography

Early years
Angus William MacLise was born on March 14, 1938, in Bridgeport, Connecticut, the son of a book dealer. Despite some formal training as a percussionist, his playing style became so idiosyncratic that many assumed he was self-taught.

The Velvet Underground

MacLise was a member of La Monte Young's Theatre of Eternal Music, with John Cale, Tony Conrad, Marian Zazeela and sometimes Terry Riley. He contributed to the early Fluxus newspaper VTre, edited by George Brecht, and was also an early member of the Velvet Underground, having been brought into the group by flatmate John Cale when they were living at 56 Ludlow Street in Manhattan. Lou Reed recruited his friend Sterling Morrison, whom he knew from Syracuse University, and the initial line-up of the Velvets consisted of Reed, Cale, Morrison and MacLise.

MacLise played bongos and hand drums during 1965 with the first incarnation of the Velvet Underground and he was also capable of playing tabla, cimbalom and tambourine. Although the band regularly  extemporised soundtracks to underground films during this era, MacLise never officially recorded with them, and is often considered something of a shadowy, legendary figure in their history. Demos recorded during this period are included on the Peel Slowly and See box set, but MacLise plays on none of them because (according to John Cale) he did not appreciate the need to turn up on time.

Cale describes MacLise as "living on the Angus calendar", showing up to gigs hours or even days after the band had finished.

When the band's first paying gig in November 1965 arose, MacLise quit, suggesting the group were selling out. He was replaced by Moe Tucker, resulting in the "classic" lineup of the Velvet Underground.

Brief return to the Velvet Underground
In 1966 when Velvet Underground lead singer and guitarist Lou Reed was in the hospital with hepatitis, MacLise rejoined the group for a five-day run of performances at Poor Richard's in Chicago, June 21–26, 1966 during the Exploding Plastic Inevitable performances, sharing duties with Gerard Malanga, whom Angus had taught to play tabla. Cale took over lead vocals and organ, drummer Maureen Tucker switched to bass and MacLise drummed; by now, Tucker's idiosyncratic tribal style of drumming was integral to the group's music.

During an Exploding Plastic Inevitable performance in 1966, MacLise showed up half an hour late and carried on drumming for half an hour after the set had finished to compensate for his late arrival.

By this time the Velvet Underground had found some recognition (if not great financial success) and MacLise was anxious to rejoin the group, but according to the notes of the box set Peel Slowly and See, the VU's primary songwriter and de facto bandleader Lou Reed had specifically prohibited MacLise from rejoining the band full-time due to his erratic behavior.

Later years
After leaving the Velvet Underground for good, MacLise moved to Berkeley, California. He married Hetty McGee in a wedding ceremony at Golden Gate Park in San Francisco, presided over by renowned LSD guru Timothy Leary. Together, they had a son named Ossian Kennard MacLise, who was recognized by Rangjung Rigpe Dorje, the 16th Karmapa, as a reincarnation of a Tibetan saint, or tulku, and at age four became a Buddhist monk. The MacLises travelled to Canada, France, Greece and India, before finally settling in Nepal.

A student of Aleister Crowley (he was working on a script for a film version of Crowley's Diary of a Drug Fiend before he died), he began to blend Tibetan mysticism with his music to create sound through various drone techniques.

Death
A heavy drug user who was never particularly mindful of his physical health, MacLise died of hypoglycemia and pulmonary tuberculosis at the Shanta Bhawan Hospital in Kathmandu on June 21, 1979, aged 41. The cause of death has also been attributed to malnutrition. He was cremated to the traditions of Tibetan Buddhists in a funeral pyre.

Recorded music
MacLise recorded a vast amount of music that went largely unreleased until 1999. These recordings, produced between the mid-'60s and the late-'70s, consist of tribal trance workouts, spoken word, poetry, Brion Gysin-like tape cut-ups and minimalist droning and electronics, as well as many collaborations with his wife Hetty. In 2008, [Hetty MacLise] bequeathed a collection of her husband's tapes to the Yale Collection of American Literature.

Selections can be found on:
The Invasion of Thunderbolt Pagoda (Siltbreeze, 1999)
Brain Damage in Oklahoma City (Siltbreeze, 2000)
The Cloud Doctrine (Sub Rosa, 2002)
Astral Collapse (Quakebasket, 2003)
The Invasion of Thunderbolt Pagoda (DVD, Bastet/Saturnalia, 2006)

MacLise also collaborated with Tony Conrad, John Cale and La Monte Young on several other recordings:

Inside the Dream Syndicate Vol.I: Day Of Niagara (Table of the Elements, 2000)
Inside the Dream Syndicate Vol.III: Stainless Steel Gamelan (Table of the Elements, 2002)
An Anthology of Noise & Electronic Music: First A-Chronology 1921-2001/Vol.1 (Sub Rosa, 2002)

He worked on soundtracks for several underground films by Piero Heliczer, and appears in at least two: Venus in Furs and Satisfaction (1965). He also worked on the soundtrack for Voyage, a short film by Jerry Jofen.

Book titles
 The Completed Works of Angus MacLise. (Privately printed by Piero Heliczer, 1957)
 Straight Farthest Blood Towards. (The Dead Language, Paris, 1959)
 Year, A Wednesday Paper Supplement. (The Dead Language Press, New York, 1962)
 New Universal Solar Calendar. (George Maciunas, New York, 1969)
 Dream Weapon/Aspen #9. Edited by Angus & Hetty MacLise (Roaring Fork Press, New York, 1970)
 The Cloud Doctrine. Limited edition with facsimile Angus MacLise holographs and hand-tinted cover by Don Snyder (privately published by Snyder in 1972 and reissued in 1983, New York) 
 The Cloud Doctrine.  (Dreamweapon Press; Kathmandu, Nepal; 1974)
 The Subliminal Report. (Starstreams Poetry Series; Kathmandu, Nepal; 1975)
 The Map of Dusk. (SZ/Press, New York, 1984)
 Ratio:3 Volume 1. Ira Cohen, Angus MacLise, Gerard Malanga - Media Shamans (Temple Press Ltd., 1991) 
 Angus MacLise Checklist. Edited by Gerard Malanga (Limited edition, privately published, 2000)

Influence
As co-founder of the Dead Language Press with Piero Heliczer, MacLise published works by influential writers, including early work by the Beat poet Gregory Corso.

English experimental music group Coil regarded MacLise as an important influence in the later years of their career; lead member Jhonn Balance referred to MacLise as a "a liminal genius and, alongside such people as Ira Cohen, largely and unjustly semi-neglected", and the title of their album Astral Disaster is an intentional tribute to MacLise's archival release Astral Collapse.

Dreamweapon
In May 2011 a major retrospective exhibit Dreamweapon: The Art and Life of Angus MacLise (1938–1979) was mounted by the Boo-Hooray Gallery in Chelsea, New York City. The exhibit features the contents of a recently discovered suitcase containing photographs, notes, poetry, and 100 reels of music. In addition to the gallery exhibit, there are sound installations at Boo-Hooray's second location in Chinatown and film screenings at the Anthology Archives.

In 1965, a work by MacLise titled Rites of the Dream Weapon was included in the New Cinema Festival (also known as the Expanded Cinema Festival), an extensive series of multimedia productions in New York presented by Jonas Mekas and featuring the work of such artists as Robert Rauschenberg and Claes Oldenburg. Mekas was impressed with MacLise, writing in the Village Voice, "The first three programs of the New Cinema Festival – the work of Angus McLise [sic], Nam June Paik, and Jerry Joffen [sic] – dissolved the edges of this art called cinema into a frontiersland mystery." MacLise's entry also made a lasting impression on the playwright Richard Foreman, who praised it years later in an interview. According to Sterling Morrison, Andy Warhol's multimedia shows (Andy Warhol Uptight and the Exploding Plastic Inevitable) were based on similar works by MacLise and Heliczer, which they called "ritual happenings."

References

External links
 Angus Maclise  AllMusic bio
 The Life and Art of the Velvet Underground’s First Drummer - Illustrated feature on Dreamweapon exhibit.
  Video clip.
  Video clip.
 Angus MacLise Sound Recordings at Yale University Beinecke Rare Book and Manuscript Library.
 Finding aid to Angus MacLise papers at Columbia University. Rare Book & Manuscript Library.

1938 births
1979 deaths
Musicians from Bridgeport, Connecticut
American avant-garde musicians
American expatriates in Greece
American expatriates in India
American rock drummers
Tuberculosis deaths in Nepal
The Velvet Underground members
20th-century deaths from tuberculosis
American rock percussionists
American expatriates in Nepal
American expatriates in France
American expatriates in Canada
American calligraphers
American male composers
American occultists
Bongo players
20th-century American poets
20th-century American composers
Tabla players
Cimbalom players
Tambourine players
20th-century American drummers
American male drummers
20th-century American male musicians
Locust Music artists
Sub Rosa Records artists
Siltbreeze Records artists